Marc-Olivier Brouillette (born February 14, 1986) is a retired Canadian football linebacker. He was drafted 23rd overall by the Montreal Alouettes in the 2010 CFL Draft. He played college football for the Montreal Carabins as the team's starting quarterback.

Professional career

Montreal Alouettes
After being drafted by the Alouettes, it was announced that Brouillette had signed a contract with the Montreal Alouettes on May 17, 2010. In seven seasons with the Alouettes, Brouillette played in 103 games registering 195 tackles, 31 special teams tackles, 8 sacks, 6 forced fumbles and 5 interceptions. He was named a CFL East All-Star for his performance during the 2016 season.

Saskatchewan Roughriders
On February 15, 2017, Brouillette signed with the Saskatchewan Roughriders. Brouillette planned to wear the number 4 jersey, which was his number in university, however he retired on May 27, 2017 just prior to the team's training camp. He re-joined the team on September 20, 2017.

References

External links

 Saskatchewan Roughriders bio
 Montreal Alouettes bio

1986 births
Canadian football linebackers
French Quebecers
Living people
Montreal Alouettes players
Saskatchewan Roughriders players
Montreal Carabins football players
Players of Canadian football from Quebec
Canadian football people from Montreal
Canadian football defensive backs